Events from the year 1849 in Germany.

Incumbents
 King of Bavaria – Maximilian II 
King of Hanover – Ernest Augustus
 King of Prussia – Frederick William IV
 King of Saxony – Frederick Augustus II

Events 
 March – The Frankfurt Parliament completes its drafting of a liberal constitution, and elects Frederick William IV emperor of the new German national state.
 April 2 – The German revolutions of 1848–49 fail, as King Frederick William IV of Prussia refuses to accept the offer of the Frankfurt National Assembly to be crowned as German emperor.
 May 3 -The May Uprising in Dresden, last of the German revolutions of 1848–49, begins. Richard Wagner is among the participants.
 May 9 – The May Uprising in Dresden is suppressed by the Kingdom of Saxony.
 June 1 8-German revolutions of 1848–49: The chamber of the Frankfurt Parliament, since reduced to a rump parliament and moved to Stuttgart, was occupied by the Württemberg army.  Repression began, which would force the liberal Forty-Eighters into exile.
 December 3 – German missionaries Johann Ludwig Krapf and Johannes Rebmann become the first Europeans to see Mount Kenya . The Abgeordnetenhaus, the lower house of the parliament of the Kingdom of Bavaria, passes a bill granting German Jews the same legal rights as German Christians. The measure draws a strong reaction from Christians across Bavaria, who sign petitions urging the upper house to prevent the equal rights measure from becoming law.

Births 

 March 19 – Alfred von Tirpitz, German admiral (d. 1930)
 April 21 – Oscar Hertwig, German zoologist (d. 1922)
 April 25 – Felix Klein, German mathematician (d. 1925)
 May 3
 Bertha Benz, German automotive pioneer (d. 1944)
 Bernhard von Bülow, 8th Chancellor of Germany (d. 1929)
 July 22 – Emma Lazarus , American author and activist (d. 1887 )
 July 29 -Edward Theodore Compton , English-German painter, mountain climber (d. 1921 )
 September 23 – Hugo von Seeliger , German astronomer (d. 1924 )
 October 26 – Ferdinand Georg Frobenius , German mathematician (d. 1917 )
 December 5 – Eduard Seler , Prussian scholar, Mesoamericanist (d. 1922 )
 December 6 – August von Mackensen , German field marshal (d. 1945 )

Deaths 
 February 28 – Regina von Siebold, German physician, obstetrician (b. 1771)
 March 24 – Johann Wolfgang Döbereiner, German chemist (b. 1780)
 May 11 -Otto Nicolai , German composer, conductor (b. 1810 )
 September 4 – Friedrich Laun , German novelist (b. 1770 )
 September 6 – Andreas Joseph Hofmann , German philosopher and revolutionary (b. 1752 )

References 

Years of the 19th century in Germany
Germany
Germany